Powellana is a genus of butterflies in the family Lycaenidae, endemic to the Afrotropical realm. Powellana is monotypic, containing the single species Powellana cottoni found in Cameroon, the Republic of the Congo, the Democratic Republic of the Congo (Equateur and Sankuru) and Uganda (from the western part of the country to the Bwamba Valley).

References

Seitz, A. Die Gross-Schmetterlinge der Erde 13: Die Afrikanischen Tagfalter. Plate XIII 64 g

Poritiinae
Monotypic butterfly genera
Taxa named by George Thomas Bethune-Baker
Lycaenidae genera